The 1909 Copa del Rey was the 7th staging of the Copa del Rey, the Spanish football cup competition.

The competition started on 4 April 1909, and concluded on 8 April 1909, with the final, held at the O'Donnell, in Madrid, in which Club Ciclista de San Sebastián lifted the trophy for the first time ever with a 3–1 victory over Español Madrid. The Basque goalscorers were George McGuinness, Charles Simmons and Miguel Sena.

Club Ciclista de San Sebastián are the predecessors of Real Sociedad. After winning the cup trophy, on 7 September 1909 the players of Club Ciclista founded a new in club in San Sebastián, called Vasconia, later changing the name to Real Sociedad.
The trophy of the 1909 Copa del Rey is in Real Sociedad's museum.

First round

Semifinals

Final

References

RSSSF.com
LinguaSport.com
IFFHS.de

1909
1909 domestic association football cups
1908–09 in Spanish football